Dunnaval is a small village and townland (of 273 acres) near Kilkeel in County Down, Northern Ireland. It is situated in the civil parish of Kilkeel and the historic barony of Mourne. In the 2001 Census it had a population of 147 people. It lies within the Newry and Mourne District Council area.

References 

NI Neighbourhood Information System

See also 
List of towns and villages in Northern Ireland
List of townlands in County Down

Villages in County Down
Townlands of County Down
Civil parish of Kilkeel